Jerar Luis Encarnación (born October 22, 1997) is a Dominican professional baseball outfielder for the Miami Marlins of Major League Baseball (MLB). He made his MLB debut in 2022.

Early life
Jerar Encarnación was born in Bayaguana, Dominican Republic, to parents Manuel and Carmela. His elder brother Anderson died in 2019.

Professional career
Encarnación signed with the Miami Marlins as an international free agent in September 2015. He made his professional debut with the Dominican Summer League Marlins in 2016.

Encarnación played 2017 with the Gulf Coast Marlins, 2018 with the Batavia Muckdogs and Greensboro Grasshoppers and 2019 with the Clinton LumberKings and Jupiter Hammerheads. After the season, he played in the Arizona Fall League.

Encarnación was invited to spring training by the Marlins in 2020. That year, the Minor League Baseball season was cancelled due to the COVID-19 pandemic, and he did not play in any games. On November 20, 2020, Encarnación was added to the 40-man roster.

On June 19, 2022, Encarnación made his MLB debut for the Miami Marlins. He hit a grand slam for his first major league hit as the Marlins defeated the New York Mets.

See also
 List of Major League Baseball players from the Dominican Republic

References

External links

1997 births
Living people
People from Monte Plata Province
Major League Baseball players from the Dominican Republic
Dominican Republic expatriate baseball players in the United States
Major League Baseball outfielders
Miami Marlins players
Dominican Summer League Marlins players
Gulf Coast Marlins players
Batavia Muckdogs players
Greensboro Grasshoppers players
Clinton LumberKings players
Jupiter Hammerheads players
Salt River Rafters players
Pensacola Blue Wahoos players
Jacksonville Jumbo Shrimp players